Das schwarze Schaf may refer to:
 The Black Sheep (1960 film), a German krimi mystery film
 Das schwarze Schaf (1944 film), a German/Czechoslovak film